Ivhanrel Eltrisna Sumerah (born 6 September 1994) is an Indonesian artist, journalist, and beauty pageant titleholder. She was crowned Miss Sulawesi Utara 2017 on January 1, 2017 in Manado, North Sulawesi. She is the second runner-up of Miss Indonesia 2017.

Early life and education
Ivhanrel 'Vhanrel' Sumerah was born on 6 September 1994 in Manado, to Dr. Meidy Revly Sumerah, a national politician currently administering Nasdem Party, and Deity Kumendong. She has a brother.

Vhanrel attended middle, and high school in her hometown in Manado, where she lived with her parents. In 2016, she graduated from Binus University with a degree in Communication Marketing.

She is passionate in vocal and music. In 2014 she won Jingle Competition for Etude House Korea. She is also an avid journalist, through 2014 she won multiple news anchor competition. She was news anchor for Berita Satu in 2014. In 2015 she was Indonesian representative for cultural exchange youth camp in Dong Daegu, South Korea. Vhanrel also had volunteered as a teacher for children in Papua

Pageantry

Keke Minahasa Utara 2012
She won her first beauty pageant in 2012 as Keke Minahasa Utara. A local beauty pageant on Minahasa Utara Regency of North Sulawesi.

Miss Earth Indonesia 2014
She competed in Miss Earth Indonesia environmental-themed beauty pageant promoting environmental awareness where she was crowned Miss Earth - Eco Tourism Indonesia 2014, and also as Miss Earth Indonesia Favorit 2014. the crowning ceremony was broadcast live on June 19, 2014 by Kompas TV.

World Miss University 2016
As Miss Earth Indonesia - Eco Tourism, she represented Indonesia in World Miss University 2016 held in Beijing. She won a special award as Miss Best Talent.

Miss Sulawesi Utara 2017
On January 1, 2017 she was crowned Miss Sulawesi Utara, and set to represent North Sulawesi in Miss Indonesia 2017.

Miss Indonesia 2017
Representing North Sulawesi, she was the second runner-up of Miss Indonesia 2017 after Achintya Holte Nielsen of West Nusa Tenggara and Astrini Putri of Bengkulu.
The awarding night was held on April 22, 2017 in MNC Studio, Jakarta and broadcast live  by RCTI.  Miss World 2016, Stephanie Del Valle of Puerto Rico was present for the crowning ceremony

Other ventures
She created LUC&IVHA an Organic bamboo fashion line, and currently she is a correspondent journalist for CNN Indonesia.

Achievements

References

External links
 
 

Indonesian beauty pageant winners
1994 births
Indonesian journalists
Indonesian women journalists
Miss Indonesia
People from Sulawesi
Living people